Megan Bankes (born 22 August 1997) is a Canadian biathlete.

In January 2022, Bankes was named to Canada's 2022 Olympic team.

Career results

World Championships

Private life 
Bankes outed herself as lesbian.

References

1997 births
Living people
Canadian female biathletes
Sportspeople from Calgary
Canadian LGBT sportspeople
Lesbian sportswomen
LGBT biathletes
Biathletes at the 2022 Winter Olympics
Olympic biathletes of Canada